The 2022 Amstel Gold Race was a road cycling one-day race that took place on 10 April 2022 in the Netherlands. It was the 56th edition of the Amstel Gold Race and the 14th event of the 2022 UCI World Tour. The race was won by Michał Kwiatkowski in a photo finish with Benoît Cosnefroy.

Teams
Twenty-five teams were invited to the race, including all eighteen UCI WorldTeams and seven UCI ProTeams.

UCI WorldTeams

 
 
 
 
 
 
 
 
 
 
 
 
 
 
 
 
 
 

UCI ProTeams

Result

References

2022 in Dutch sport
2022 UCI World Tour
April 2022 sports events in the Netherlands
Amstel Gold Race